Dayton is a borough in Armstrong County, Pennsylvania, United States. The population was 549 at the 2020 census.

History
The Thomas Marshall House was listed on the National Register of Historic Places in 1976, and is home to the Dayton Area Local History Society.

Geography
Dayton is located at  (40.881095, -79.241526) in eastern Armstrong County. Pennsylvania Route 839 leads south  to Pennsylvania Route 85 near NuMine and north  to Pennsylvania Route 28 in South Bethlehem.

Demographics

As of the census of 2000, there were 543 people, 229 households, and 150 families residing in the borough. The population density was 1,208.1 people per square mile (465.9/km2). There were 254 housing units at an average density of 565.1 per square mile (217.9/km2). The racial makeup of the borough was 100.00% White.

There were 229 households, out of which 29.7% had children under the age of 18 living with them, 54.6% were married couples living together, 7.9% had a female householder with no husband present, and 34.1% were non-families. 31.9% of all households were made up of individuals, and 17.0% had someone living alone who was 65 years of age or older. The average household size was 2.37 and the average family size was 2.97.

The borough median age of 42 years was more than the county median age of 40 years. The distribution by age group was 22.7% under the age of 18, 6.6% from 18 to 24, 26.2% from 25 to 44, 23.0% from 45 to 64, and 21.5% who were 65 years of age or older. The median age was 42 years. For every 100 females there were 94.6 males. For every 100 females age 18 and over, there were 89.2 males.

The median income for a household in the borough was $30,156, and the median income for a family was $36,250. Males had a median income of $26,719 versus $18,333 for females. The per capita income for the borough was $15,036. About 5.7% of families and 7.3% of the population were below the poverty line, including 8.5% of those under age 18 and 9.6% of those age 65 or over.

See also
West Shamokin High School

References

External links

Populated places established in 1850
Boroughs in Armstrong County, Pennsylvania